Jane Loeau (December 5, 1828 – July 30, 1873) was a Hawaiian chiefess during the Kingdom of Hawaii who attended the Chiefs' Children's School, also known as the Royal School.

Early life and education 
She was born December 5, 1828, at Waimea, Kauai, the daughter of High Chief Kalaniulumoku and High Chiefess Kuini Liliha. Her mother was the royal governor of Oahu and was politically powerful during the regency of Kaahumanu. She was descended from Kahekili II, Moi of Maui, and High Chief Hoapili through her mother. She had a half-sister Abigail Maheha. She was adopted or hānaied by Ahukai (Kaukualii).

At a young age, she was placed in the Chiefs' Children's School, also known as the Royal School, a select school for the royal children of the highest rank who were eligible to be rulers. Along with her other classmates, she was chosen by Kamehameha III to be eligible for the throne of the Kingdom of Hawaii. She was one of the first to attend Chiefs' Children's School. Her classmates included her half-sister Abigail Maheha and fourteen other royal cousins. Out of the sixteen children of the school five would rule as monarchs of the kingdom.

They were taught by Amos Starr Cooke and his wife, Juliette Montague Cooke, to eat, dress, and speak like European or American children. In the classroom students were divided by their age and length of time at the school. At the age of eleven, she was the eldest girl and student at the school and a member of the senior level class. On Sundays it was customary for boys and girls to walk side by side to church; Jane walked beside Moses Kekūāiwa, the eldest boy at the school and brother of Alexander Liholiho and Lot Kapuaiwa. They were betrothed to one another.

In her school days, she was a closed friend of Bernice Pauahi, who was the only girl at the school around her age. She and Bernice often played on the piano, teaching the younger girls how to sing and play the piano. Among them was Lydia Kamakaeha, who would be Hawaii's last queen and a great composer.

American merchant Gorham D. Gilman visited the Royal School in 1848, after both Jane and Abigail had left the school. He commented on the two sisters' education, declining family rank and inability to support themselves:

Marriage 
Loeau was known for her good looks and lively ways. When she turned eighteen she left school. She was originally intended for Moses Kekūāiwa, the eldest of the Kamehameha brothers, but after his expulsion from the school, he had shown no further interest in her. Thus, she was encouraged by the Cookes to break off her betrothal and accept the courting of John Robert Jasper, a young American attorney from Virginia. Loeau married Jasper on September 2, 1847. The marriage had the sanction of the Privy Council.
Their wedding party was held at Chiefs' Children School and was a festive event. Seventy-five people were present, including King Kamehameha III, Queen Kalama, chiefs, chiefesses, the privy council, ministers of state, consuls, missionaries and other foreigners. Her marriage to John Jasper was not a happy one as noted later on by her school teacher Mrs. Cooke in her diary:

Jane's marriage with Mr. Jasper turns out to be a sad affair. He is, and has been, very intemperate and she has not been any better for it, and now he has forbidden any one trusting her on his account. The probability is that they will be divorced....

Their marriage was one of greatest scandals in Honolulu in those days and was a continental source of gossip. As Mrs. Cooke predicted, their marriage eventually ended in divorce, and Jasper died on April 29, 1851.

Writing in 1854, United States Commissioner to the Hawaiian Kingdom David L. Gregg painted a negative picture of Loeau and her marriage to Jasper which contrasted with Cooke's account:

Loeau married for the second time to Marvin Seger on March 15, 1855. Seger was a Honolulu businessman with a shop on Maunakea Street. This second union also ended in divorce and Loeau petitioned to be able to remarry.
She remarried on December 6, 1862 to S. L. Kaelemakule in a ceremony officiated by Reverend Artemas Bishop in Honolulu. Loeau had a son named Paki-liilii Kaelemakule with her third husband.

Later life and death 
She later moved to Lahaina, but returned to Honolulu where she lived out the rest of her life in relative obscurity.
Loeau died on July 30, 1873 at Puunui, Honolulu. While still considered strong of body, she had been feeling chest pains after bathing and the condition resulted in her early death. Her body was laid to rest in the cemetery at Kawaiahaʻo Church.
In a letter to her cousin Peter Kaʻeo, Queen Emma complained about the tastelessness and the lack of respect Loeau, their former classmate, was given in her obituary written by Ka Nūhou, which was only a brief account of her genealogy. The Hawaiian press was much more sympathetic. On August 6, 1873, her husband S. L. Kaelemakule wrote an article along with a mele kanaenae (traditional Hawaiian chant) on Ko Hawaii Ponoi in honor of her. In it he described her and their marriage:

We were together for 10 years, 7 months, and 25 days in the covenant of marriage in peace and happiness. We did not leave one another, but it was the angel of heaven who has separated us, and I live with sadness and never-ending regret. She is one of the royal descendants of Hawaii nei, born of alii "Papa." From ancient times, her rank was of royalty, but she humbled herself, befriended and warmly welcomed newcomers, she was loving, and she was kind in actions and words, and she was a follower of the Lord.

References

Bibliography 

1828 births
1873 deaths
Royalty of the Hawaiian Kingdom
Hawaiian princesses
House of Kekaulike
Hawaiian adoptees (hānai)
People from Kauai